Hawazma, part of Sudan's Baggara tribe, are cattle herders who roam the area from the southern parts of North Kurdufan to the southern borders of South Kurdufan, a distance of about 300 kilometers.  Through their nomadic movement, the Hawazma know the area, terrain, ethnic groups, local tribes, tribal cultures, ecosystems, climate, vegetation, existence of risks and diseases, and water resources better than any other inhabitants of the region. The term Baggara is a collective name applied to all cattle-herding tribes with Arab roots.  Cattle herders from Nuba tribes are not called Baggara.  Cattle herders of middle and eastern Sudan, although they Arabic in roots, are also not Baggara.  The Baggara occupies a wide area, from Kordofan, Mid-Western Sudan, to Darfur in the far Western Sudan and extending to neighboring Chad.  They are a collection of seven major tribes:  Hawazma, Messiria Humr Messiria Zurug, Rizeigat, Ta’isha, Habbaniya, Beni Halba, Awlad Himayd, and Beni Selam.  All Baggara have close physical characteristics, costumes, dance, religion, food, and in general a common culture and way of life.

Origins
The Hawazma are believed to have migrated to Sudan during early days of Islamic missionaries to Africa as part of Baggara Arabs, perhaps as early as the 12th century.  Most historians believe they belong to the  Juhayna group; a clan of Bedouin Arabs which migrated from Saudi Arabia.  Hawazma traditional historians say they originally came from the Arabian Peninsula to Egypt then followed the River Nile until they settled on Jebel Awliyya part of Khartoum Province and as the grazing land became scarce and overcrowded they gradually moved to Western Sudan.  These stories correspond well with the presence of scores of Hawazma in Kosti, Middle Sudan, Um Rowaba, Eastern part of Kordofan and Al Rahad, middle-eastern part of Kordofan.  The journey continued beyond Kordofan, to Darfur on the Western Sudan and today they have reached Chad, the country on western border of Sudan.

According to British colonial administrator Harold MacMichael, in the mid-eighteenth century in the days of the Funj, heads of families from six tribes, finding themselves unable to stand alone, came to the Hawazma and asked for protection and agreed to join the Hawazma. The leaders of these groups swore an oath binding themselves to the Hawazma, and they were referred to henceforth as the Halafa. The six tribes that formed the Halafa subgroup of the Hawazma: the Bedaria, Takarir, Jellaba Howara, Gawama’a, Zenara and Nuba. <ref

Present routes 
Wherever Baggara settle they start a seasonal nomadic movement that goes from north to south, in a Round-Robin fashion according to the season and perpendicular to their historical migration route.  Mostly they only follow two routes, one route from north to south and different route from south to north. But the routes are not far apart, and they are permanent, they never change them.  Any tribe has its own routes.  Hawazma are mostly found in routes originating from Al Obeid city in North Kurdufan, through Deling city and its eastern part, Kadugli city and its eastern part, to Talodi region.  Messiria just borders them to the west. Humr borders Messiria to the west. And so forth.

Today the Hawazma in particular and Baggara in general bear little resemblance to Bedouin Arabs, due to their acclimatization and their inter-marriage with other African tribes.  Many Hawazma subtribes have dark skin, and closely resemble Nuba tribes.  And many members of these tribes speak Nuba dialects fluently.  Still some tribe names indicate their mixed origins. Other Hawazma subtribes have preserved their Arabic features: light brown complexion, and thick eyebrows and lashes.

Socio-economic factors: pastoralism and agriculture

When Hawazma families lose their herds they settle.  Generally, Hawazma settled in villages or established villages from southern parts of Al Obeid city in Northern Kordofan to Talodi city in South Kordofan.  Those who settled in northern border of South Kordofan or Southern border of North Kordofan are mostly Gumaiyya, including:  Gumaiyya Kilaibab, Gumaiyya Al Hussienat, and Gumaiyya Matrafia, in addition to other Hawazma Oulad Gaboush and Dar Niayylie.  These subtribes intermarried with Bidaria and Mosabaat and other Kordofanian tribes.  Their lifestyle closely resembles the Kordofanian tribes.  Mostly engaged in raising crops and cattle.  Notably their Hawazma Arabic Accent is inclined to include Kordofanian Arabic accents.  Similarly, they adopted a way of cultivation, crop tending, and harvesting similar to those other Kordofanian tribes.  They used a long-handled spade called Jarrieh and Saloqqa, they tend their farm while standing, not similar to those of Hawazma deep in South Kordofan who tend while they are sitting on their heels.  Their crops include:  millet, watermelon, groundnuts, sesame and hibiscus.

Those who settled in the middle of South Kordofan in Kadugli and its suburb, include:  Gumaiyya Nafar Balal, Gumaiyya Nafar Ayyad, Gumaiyya Nafar Adam and others.  These who settled around the Deling city and its suburb are mostly Hawazma Dar Niayylie.   Both groups have adopted the mainstream Hawazma way of life and their Hawazma Arabic accents.  In terms of agricultural practices, they grow sorghum, sesame, cotton and okra.  They mostly use tools such as Sollucab for seeding and Antabab and axe for clearing shrubs and trees.  Mostly cultivate by uprooting grasses with their bare hands.  These are among the most victimized Hawazma during this civil wars.
On the southern parts of South Kordofan, settled Hawazma Al Rawawqa.  Al Rawawqa subtribe embodies large subsubtribal diversity.  Among the most prevalent are Rawawqa Oulad Nuba.  These are group of Hawazma who most resembles Nuba in most of their living habits and agricultural practices.  They cultivate with Jarrieh a Nuba developed tool, tend while sitting on their heels.  Mostly grow sorghum, sesame, and groundnuts and gather wild okra. Again these are among the most victimized Hawazma in the region.

On the eastern side of South Kordofan, lives Hawazma Darbettie, now separated from those living central South Kordofan, due to geographic distance.
On the western parts of South Kordofan, no Hawazma live their, it is found our cousins:  Messiria, Humr, Rezeigat, Ta'isha and Habbaniya.  They have similar lifestyles as Hawazma, and only differentiated by their phonetic accents of Arabic language.

Character, appearance and costumes

Hawazma, like any other Baggara people, have graceful slim physical statues; their skins range from light brown to dark colors. However, although they are referred to as Arabs; phenotypically, the Hawazma and other Baggara peoples are similar to other local indigenous populations. Men of all ages always carry knives, which are worn on the forceps of the left arm and hidden in a decorated leather covering, carry sticks, spears, sometimes swords or big spears. The women wear a dress called , and cover their bodies with taubes such as Indian sari. Young men wear eye-catching colored flashy shirts, shorts, pants, beads, necklaces, and bracelets. Young women wear  during festivals and dancing to show their ornate braided hairstyles.

Sociological issues: gender, health and education
Baggara are mostly illiterate.  In the early days, they look to the school as a way to alienate their kids, to teach them moral delinquencies, to distract them from Baggara way of life: cattle herding and nomadic movement.  Young Baggara look after cows daylong, they return to Baggara camp during evening times. Baggara lack clean drinking water, health clinics, electricity, television, radio and other forms of media.  Pregnant women rarely visit clinics or doctors.  Female genital circumcision is common.  Facial scarring called Shoulokh, lips sticking, and braided hair are usual practices among women.

Women represent an important workforce; they milk cows, prepare meals, raise kids, market dairy products, build houses, and participate in crop cultivation.  Baggara youth are cheerful group in the Baggara families; their main mental set to look for festivals, rituals, dancing gossip around for abstinence and only supervises young kids to range cattle.  Men are completely idle during dry seasons, play Dala (sort of cards played with sticks) and coordinate the meager activity during summer such as delivering grains to mills and bringing the daily family grocery from women's marketed-dairy-product money.  Baggara raise huge herds, never for marketing, but for prestige.  The wealth and prestige is determined by the size of one's herds.   The work of anthropologist Barbara Michael work is a large contribution to the subject of Hawazma socio-enonomics.

Beginnings of conflict

Beginning in early 1983, radio broadcasts by South Sudanese rebels alarmed the people of South Kordofan and increased tensions in the area.

Soon after, weapons started to appear on the black market. The military started recalling retirees and drafting young men for service. The weapons trade was flourishing with gun sellers roaming the Baggara villages and nomad camps.  The militiamen given themselves roles to protect the Baggara camps and fight to defend the villages.

Nomeri's regime began arming Messiria Zurug and Messiria Humr to balance the rebel attack on Abyei area.  The rebels attacked a Chevron Oil Company site, killing four Chevron employees. Also, they attacked the Baggara campuses to acquire cattle for food.  Now the war completely broke at southwest of South Kordofan.  By the end of Normeri's regime, in 1985, South Kordofan was in chaos although other parts of Kordofan were peaceful.

During, Al Sadiq Al Mahdi era, the Messiria Zurug and Messiria Humr were armored , the paramilitary forces became legal and carrying weapons was legal.  Everyone had AK-47 machine gun.  During this time rebels attacked the southern part of South Kordofan, especially Gardoud village, around Talodi city.  The Baggara were heavily victimized in Gardoud;  sixty Baggara were dead, 82 wounded; see the first Paragraph in this report .  Religious leaders and Imams, were publicly executed, women were raped, houses were burned and cattle herds were raided.  South Kordofan now is a war zone.  People evacuated the cities, traders stopped their trades, and all other tribes and ethnic groups not from South Kordofan left the region.

Civil war
In 1987, Yusif Kuwa Mekki entered South Kordofan as commander for the rebels .  Immediately war expanded to el Hamra, el Buram, Um Sirdiba and surrounding areas.  Hawazma villages were systematically targeted by rebels, killing them as groups, individuals or evacuated them completely as happened in Um Sirdiba. Africa Justice organization provided many reports documenting abuses by SPLA .  These reports indicate the worse human rights situation in South Kordofan.

In 1989, Al Boukhas village was completely destroyed and about 40 villages of Hawazma were either attacked or evacuated before the attack and the people left their possessions and crops. By the end of 1989, about 300,000 Baggara were either relocated to big cities or displaced and resettled on the northern border of South Kordofan.  For six years, Kuwa war machines (six battalions) were directed to systematic torturing of Baggara tribes, completely destroying their infrastructures and eliminating their educated youth; leaders; and the elite.  We have not seen any major attack on military campuses or major military stronghold places in South Kordofan.  The war was directed toward Baggara tribesmen.

In January 1990 Abu Safifa village was burned to the ground. By February 1990, only Baggara men stayed on the villages while kids, women and the elderly were displaced or relocated.  The war became ethnic cleansings against the Baggara, while the west was still misled with the NGOs, which look after their religious and political agenda in South Kordofan's desperate tribal wars.  Rebel guerrilla fighters were looking for excitement in the news by destroying Baggara villages to show their presence, then escape to the mountains tops such as Morou Mountain or Tolishi Mountains.

Nuba militia fighters found a breeding ground in the presence of rebels fighters.  Tarrevera militia fighters, from Morou, crossed the road for every vehicle; evacuating Baggara and executing them.  They placed road mines and ambushed cars.  When mines went off, they would attack; kill or loot goods and then they would escape to mountains or densely forested valleys.

During the military regime of President Omar Hassan al-Bashir, which came to power in June 1989, by revolting against elected Prime Minister Sadiq Al Mahdi government, South Kordofan entered a new phase of the civil war. Islamic jihad war against infidels was completely the norm of life in South Kordofan.  Religious decrees (Fatwas) were declared urging people to join the war .  The Baggara are 100 percent Muslims and 75 percent of Nuba are Muslims. Then who was the Islamic war against?  However, due to the desperation of Baggara, following the unspeakable atrocities by rebels, they sided with the military forces to protect themselves.  Soon, Yusuf Kuwa and rebels fighters realized the effect of Baggara on the war balance; basically attributed to their knowledge of the terrain and the intricacies of South Kordofan.  The Baggara lead the government forces to caves and hiding places for the rebels.  Rebels Commander Yusif Kuwa Mekki started to negotiate with Baggara , either to take side with him or at least to refrain from supporting the government army against the rebels.  Yusuf Kuwa succeeded in convening and writing many mutual agreements with local Baggara leaders.

Baggara held good to their agreements.  This came to disadvantage the government.  The government, thereafter, started a full swing against Baggara, who hold to their agreements by jailing, torturing or killing or forcing them to refrain from any agreements.

As of today, with peace agreement in progress, Baggara has nothing to negotiate.  They were used, abused and victimized by the rebels and the Government forces. NGOs never came to Baggara villages to report the atrocities, and probably assumed not deserving any human rights.

See also
 Baggara

References

External links 
 African Justice interviewed Yousif Kuwa Mekki, he said, quote: "If you look at our soldiers, most of them are not educated and not politically conscious, so you should expect that if someone like this has a gun in his hand, he feels he is powerful and can do whatever he wants. And in fact specifically at the beginning of our entry in '89 a lot of soldiers started to rampage and to loot, and we started (to impose) very harsh punishments, even we (sent some to the)firing squad. We tried our best to stop that. Another time when we had hunger in '91-'92, some started to use their guns so they can acquire whatever [they need]. That is why we tried to politicise the soldiers. We try to tell them that it is not our purpose to come and loot our own people and harass them. Whoever does this will be punished. We gave them very harsh punishments" end quote.
  This link gives a comprehensive details to what had happened between 1985 - 1995 in South Kordofan, it made special emphasis to the atrocities happened to the Nuba related to Messiria, although the bulk of SPLA force at that time was on the southern mountains where Hawazma lives, however, no reference to Hawazma casualties or involvement was cited, that was due to the fact that the Hawazma were not armed and had no effect on the SPLA, but that did not mean that they were not heavily targeted by the SPLA forces. The report speak to that effect.
  Dr Mohamed Suliman, Chairman, Institute for African Alternatives, London, said in this link: "The Baggara lost some of their traditional lands, many men, and animals. Their trade with the Nuba collapsed. Losses forced the Baggara in several areas to negotiate peace with the Nuba".
  Dr Mohamed Suliman, Chairman, Institute for African Alternatives, London, cited in the link: "Since 1993, several peace agreements have been reached between the Nuba and the Baggara: the Buram agreement (1993), the Regifi agreement (1995), and the Kain agreement (1996)". These agreements were between the Baggara and SPLA.  The reasons behind these agreements were give in the article.
. UN Report.  The report includes a section detailing the conflict between Hawazma and Nuba.

Baggara tribes